Harry Koch (born 15 November 1969) is a German former professional footballer, who played as a centre-back, and a coach.

His son Robin (b. 1996) is also a footballer, currently with English Premier League club Leeds United, and is a German International.

Football career
Born in Bamberg, Koch arrived in the Bundesliga at already 26, with 1. FC Kaiserslautern, after having played amateur football, and quickly became an undisputed starter. In 1997–98, he played in 31 matches as the club won the national league straight out of the second division.

In 2003, after 187 matches with 17 goals in the first division, Koch moved to SV Eintracht Trier 05, closing out his career three years later. Immediately after, he took up coaching, replacing Werner Kartz at the helm of lower-level team SV Dörbach.

Honours
1. FC Kaiserslautern
 Bundesliga (1): 1997–98
 DFB-Pokal (1): 1995–96; runner-up 2002–03
 2. Bundesliga (1): 1996–97

References

External links
 
 

1969 births
Living people
German footballers
Association football defenders
Bundesliga players
2. Bundesliga players
SpVgg Greuther Fürth players
1. FC Kaiserslautern players
SV Eintracht Trier 05 players
German football managers
Sportspeople from Bamberg
Footballers from Bavaria
West German footballers